Udoji United was a Nigerian football team founded in 1990 in Enugu before moving to Awka in 1993. It was owned by Oscar Udoji, Owner and CEO of Solgas Petroleum Limited and Superior Motors Limited and son of former businessman/administrator Chief Jerome Oputa Udoji.

After their first season in 1991, they won promotion to the Nigeria Premier League. The team won the title in 1996, thus becoming the Nigerian representative in the CAF Champions League's debut in 1997. They were demoted after the 1998 season but won promotion back to the top league the next season after winning the Division. They however were demoted back after the 2000 season by one point and soon sold.

Achievements
Nigeria Premier League: 1
1996

Professional Second Division: 1
1999

Performance in CAF competitions
CAF Champions League: 1 appearance
1997: Second Round

External links
Nigerian sports at crossroads (Sunday Tribune)
Homepage of St. Paul Edeh

Defunct football clubs in Nigeria
Football clubs in Anambra State
Association football clubs established in 1990
Association football clubs disestablished in 2001
1990 establishments in Nigeria
2001 disestablishments in Nigeria